Boldești-Scăeni, often spelled Boldești-Scăieni, is a town in Prahova County, southern Romania. Located about 15 km north of Ploiești, it is an important oil-extraction center. It is situated in the historical region of Muntenia.

History

The town was created in 1968 by the unification of two neighbouring communes, Boldești and Scăeni. One village, Seciu, is administered by the town.

The phalanstère

Scăeni was the location of the only attempt to create a Charles Fourier-type phalanstère in Romania. In 1835, Theodor Diamant, a utopian socialist who had met Fourier in Paris, created the phalanstère, named The Agronomy and Manufacturing Society, on a patch of land provided by Emanoil Bălăceanu, a local land-owner. The Wallachian authorities saw this enterprise as a threat and took a stand against it. Therefore, the phalanstère was disbanded in 1836, a year and a half after it came into existence, with Diamant and Bălăceanu sent into exile.

World War II
During World War II, the area was extensively bombed, as part of Operation Tidal Wave. Air-raid shelters can still be found on the wooded hills around Boldești.

Coat of arms

The coat of arms of Boldești-Scăeni depicts a thistle (in Romanian, scai or scaiete) which refers to the name of the old Scăeni commune, as well as a grape, which represents the vineyards on the Seciu hills. The shaking hands is a reminder of the 19th century Scăieni phalanstère experiment, but could also refer to the 1968 union of the Boldești and Scăieni communes.

Climate
Boldești-Scăeni has a humid continental climate (Cfb in the Köppen climate classification).

Economy

The town's economy revolves around oil-extraction as well as winemaking. Almost half of the town's surface is cultivated with vine. The Seciu winecellars are located in the direct vicinity of Boldești.

Industry developed in the town after 1968, with a glass factory open in Scăeni. Many people who live in Boldești-Scăeni also work in the neighbouring city of Ploiești.

Trivia and Historical monuments 
The utopian experiment by Theodor Diamant was featured in the movie "Falansterul" ("The Phalanstere"), directed by Savel Stiopul in 1979. Historical monuments in the city Boldești-Scăeni includes 6 historic monuments (3 in Seciu and 3 in the city itself), plus 3 new modern statues sculpted by Cristian Petru Balan from the United States. They are "Glass Breaker", a stainless steel statue, 6 m high, built in 2010, a single replica of the Statue of Liberty in New York City, worked in fiberglass reinforced concrete (5 m from ground) and statuary group "Mihai Eminescu and Veronica Micle" in front of the Culture House "Mihai Eminescu", two busts on a common base (2.5 m), all molded fiberglass and reinforced concrete. Last two monuments were erected in July 2014. Since ancient monuments only one is classified as a monument of national importance, that being "Casa Rusescu" in Seciu, built in 1826.

Natives
 Cristian Vlad

Notes

References

  Scrisori către Vasile Alecsandri: Teodor Diamant (Letters to Vasile Alecsandri: Teodor Diamant), from wikisource.
  Boldeşti-Scăieni: Monograph of Boldeşti-Scăieni, (by Cristian Petru Bălan, Ed. Premier, 2007), from wikisource.
  Romanian Government Decision no. 1697/2004, retrieved from legislatie.just.ro on 27 August 2007

Towns in Romania
Populated places in Prahova County
Localities in Muntenia